Grenada have competed in ten Commonwealth Games. The first Games for the nation was in 1970. They attended the next three Games, but did not appear between 1982 and 1998. Grenada have only won 5 Commonwealth Games medal to date: in 2006, a silver in the men's 400 metres from Alleyne Francique, in 2014 they won a bronze medal in the men's decathlon from Kurt Felix and their first ever gold medal: Kirani James in the men's 400 metres. This made the Glasgow 2014 the most successful Commonwealth Games in their history. They repeated the achievement in the Gold Coast 2018 when Lindon Victor won their second gold medal, this time in the decathlon and Javelin Thrower Anderson Peters won the bronze medal in his event.

All-time medal tally

Medals

References

 
Nations at the Commonwealth Games